Bruce Michael Bullen (born 15 April 1947) is an American government and health care executive from Boston, Massachusetts.

Career
He was the interim chief executive officer (handpicked by Charlie Baker) and formerly chief operating officer of Harvard Pilgrim Health Care, Inc. (HPHC), a non-profit healthcare services entity formed from the merger of the Harvard Community Health Plan and Pilgrim Health Care

Before working at HPHC, Bullen was the Commissioner of the Division of Medical Assistance in Massachusetts (DMA), where he was responsible for the administration of the MassHealth (the Medicaid in Massachusetts) program.  

Prior to DMA, Bullen worked in Massachusetts state government on the Senate Budget Ways & Means Committee. 

Bullen has a master's degree in public administration from the John F. Kennedy School of Government at Harvard University and an undergraduate degree from Williams College in 1970.

Personal life
Bullen lives in Weston, Massachusetts, with his wife Maria Krokidas, a Boston attorney, and their three children.

References

 "Speaker Biography: Bruce Bullen" – worldcongress.org.
 "Board biography: George Bullen" – Massachusetts Foundation for the Humanities
 Torgerson, Sharon, "CHARLES D. BAKER TO LEAVE AS CEO OF HARVARD PILGRIM HEALTH CARE BRUCE BULLEN NAMED AS INTERIM CEO OF HEALTH PLAN", press release, Harvard Pilgrim Health Care, July 8, 2009

External links 
 "Let's Talk Health Care" – Harvard Pilgrim's CEO, Bruce Bullen, blogs about the health care industry

People from Boston
1947 births
Living people
American health care chief executives
American chief operating officers
American nonprofit chief executives
Harvard Kennedy School alumni
People from Weston, Massachusetts
Williams College alumni